Gymnophthalmus leucomystax,  the white spectacled tegu, is a species of lizard in the family Gymnophthalmidae. It is found in Brazil and Guyana.

References

Gymnophthalmus
Reptiles of Brazil
Reptiles of Guyana
Reptiles described in 1991
Taxa named by Paulo Vanzolini
Taxa named by Celso Morato de Carvalho